Maun General Hospital is a government-run district hospital located in Maun, the fifth largest town in Botswana. As of 2011, it had a population of 55,784. Maun is the "tourism capital" of Botswana and the administrative centre of Ngamiland district.

References

External links 
 Botswana Ministry of Health

Hospitals in Botswana